Kurt Schein (born 12 December 1930) is a former Austrian cyclist. He competed at the 1956 Summer Olympics and the 1960 Summer Olympics.

References

External links
 

1930 births
Living people
Austrian male cyclists
Olympic cyclists of Austria
Cyclists at the 1956 Summer Olympics
Cyclists at the 1960 Summer Olympics
Cyclists from Vienna